2011–2012 NBB season was the fourth season of Novo Basquete Brasil, the Brazilian basketball league. This tournament is organized entirely by the participating clubs. The NBB serves as a qualifying competition for international tournaments such as Liga Sudamericana and Torneo InterLigas. For this season the qualify for the FIBA Americas League came to be through the Liga Sudamericana.

The season started on November 19 and was disputed with 16 participating teams playing each other in round and second round in the regular season. At the end of two rounds the top four teams qualify for the quarterfinals of the playoffs automatically, while the teams finishing in the 5th and 12th place participated in the first round of the playoffs to determine the other four teams in the quarterfinals, best of five matches, advances to the next phase who win three games.

Participating teams 

 Franca
 Paulistano
 Araraquara
 Bauru
 São José
 Pinheiros
 Winner Limeira
 Liga Sorocabana
Flamengo
 Tijuca
 Brasília
 Minas
 Uberlândia
 CETAF Vila Velha
 Joinville
 Vitória Basquete gave to dispute the season 2011/2012.

Regular season 

% - percentage; Pts - points; G – games disputed; W - wins; D - defeats; PM - points made; PA - points against; PA - points average.

Classification

Playoffs- first round

Uberlândia (5) vs. (12) Tijuca

Game 1

Game 2

Game 3

Game 4

Bauru (6) vs. (11) Liga Sorocabana

Game 1

Game 2

Game 3

Paulistano (7) vs. (10) Franca

Game 1

Game 2

Game 3

Joinville (8) vs. (9) Limeira

Game 1

Game 2

Game 3

Game 4

Game 5

Playoffs

Quarterfinals

São José (1) vs. (10) Franca

Game 1

Game 2

Game 3

Pinheiros (2) vs. (8) Joinville

Game 1

Game 2

Game 3

Game 4

Game 5

Brasíla (3) vs. (6) Bauru

Game 1

Game 2

Game 3

Flamengo (4) vs. (5) Uberlândia

Game 1

Game 2

Game 3

Game 4

Game 5

Semifinals

São José (1) vs. (4) Flamengo

Game 1

Game 2

Game 3

Game 4

Game 5

Pinheiros (2) vs. (3) Brasília

Game 1

Game 2

Game 3

Game 4

Game 5

Final

São José (1) vs. (3) Brasília

Awards 
 MVP - Murilo Becker (São José)
 Finals MVP - Guilherme Giovannoni (Brasília)
 Sixth Player - Paulinho Boracini (Pinheiros)
 Best Defender - Alex Garcia (Brasília)
 Revelation - Gui Deodato (Bauru)
 Most Improved Player - Gui Deodato (Bauru)
 Coach - Régis Marrelli (São José)

All-Team

References

Novo Basquete Brasil seasons
NBB
Brazil